Russian Souvenir is a 1960 Soviet comedy film directed by Grigori Aleksandrov.

Plot 
Varvara Komarova in a company with foreigners is sent by plane to Beijing. After the forced landing of an aircraft on the shore of Lake Baikal, tourists observe life in the USSR and understand that the Russians are a peace-loving people with whom you can exist in harmony.

Cast

References

External links 

 
 Russian Souvenir on Ivi.ru

1960 films
1960s Russian-language films
Soviet comedy films
1960 comedy films
Mosfilm films